Epipactis papillosa  is an orchid from the genus Epipactis. Epipactis papillosa is found from the Russia Far East (Kamchatka, Sakhalin, Primorye, Kuril Islands, Khabarovsk), northeastern China (Liaoning), Korea and Japan. It grows 30–70 cm tall and has five to seven leaves. It blooms in the fall with 10-20 pale green flowers. It grows in forests.

References 

papillosa
Orchids of Asia
Flora of Russia
Flora of Liaoning
Flora of Korea
Flora of Japan
Plants described in 1878